Salnik is a rural locality (a village) in Beketovskoye Rural Settlement, Vozhegodsky District, Vologda Oblast, Russia. The population was 3 as of 2002.

Geography 
Salnik is located 65 km west of Vozhega (the district's administrative centre) by road. Kozlovo is the nearest rural locality.

References 

Rural localities in Vozhegodsky District